Galavisión is an American Spanish-language pay television network owned by TelevisaUnivision. The network is unrelated to the earlier Mexican channel of the same name, though both broadcast Televisa-produced programming.

As of February 2015, approximately 68,355,000 American households (58.7% of households with television) received Galavisión.

History 

Galavisión started on April 2, 1979, as a premium cable network, broadcasting a mix of classic and recent Mexican and other Spanish-language films as well as Spanish-dubbed recent Hollywood productions.

By 1984, the network became a general entertainment basic cable channel, offering a combination of Televisa programming and SIN reruns.

In the mid 1990s, Galavisión was led by Javier Saralegui and aired a mix of Spanish- and English-language programs like Kiki desde Hollywood or Funny is Funny.  They also incorporated Miami-produced variety entertainment show A Oscuras Pero Encendidos, hosted by Paul Bouche. It complemented this strategy with Televisa-produced programs that first aired on Univision, with entertainment and some news programs from Televisa's all-news network ECO, including an Entertainment Tonight-style program anchored by Pita Ojeda and Ilia Calderón.

Since the year 2000, Galavisión aired a combination of classic comedy, telenovelas, and late night shows from the 1970s, 1980s and 1990s that aired originally on Univision, with more present-day offerings from news, sports and specials originating from Televisa's three networks, Las Estrellas, FOROtv, and Nueve as well as two shows produced by Televisa's music network, TeleHit.

On its most recent programming strategy, Galavisión expanded original productions with shows like Acceso máximo, En casa con Lucy, Delicioso (hosted by Ingrid Hoffmann), Vida total, Decorando contigo, Un destino, Lo mejor de boxeo en esta esquina, the best of sister network UniMás's Solo boxeo series.

The Televisa produced programming is also crafted to fit strict broadcast standards.

Sports and news programming 
Galavisión's coverage of soccer, produced by Televisa, is done with a secondary or "clean" feed in which any references to Televisa are not shown and Galavisión supplants the feed with Univision's announcers and graphics. In the early days, Galavisión would use the whole Televisa feed while covering any Televisa promotions or sponsor tags with a green generic Galavisión border logo.

As for news programming, Galavisión, while owned by Univision Networks, has no news operations and instead airs newscasts from Televisa's networks Canal de las Estrellas, FOROtv, and Gala TV.

Because most of Mexico does not observe daylight saving time the same day as the United States, morning programs like "Despierta con Carlos Loret de Mola" are aired on an hour delay on Galavisión during said time, from the second Sunday in March until the first Sunday in April and again during the week between the last Sunday in October and the first Sunday in November.

Programming

Current programming

Upcoming programming

Former programming

Telenovelas
A que no me dejas (October 25, 2021 - February 4, 2022)
Acapulco, cuerpo y alma (April 2, 1998 - July 22, 1998)
Al diablo con los guapos (April 28 - September 19, 2014; March 15 - July 27, 2021)
Alma de hierro (March 25–29, 2013)
Alma rebelde (June 18 - October 24, 2001)
Alondra (January 5–February 27, 1999, first-run; May 2, 2004 – January 30, 2005)
Amada enemiga (June 8 - September 25, 1999)
Amigas y Rivales  (September 22, 2014 - April 14, 2015)
Amigos x siempre (November 29, 2000 - April 30, 2001)
Amor de barrio (February 10 - April 24, 2020)
Amor Real  (September 15 - December 19, 2014)
Amor sin maquillaje (May 7–24, 2018)
Amorcito corazón (September 7, 2020 - March 2, 2021)
Amy, la niña de la mochila azul (May 11 - October 16, 2015)
Angela (March 15 - July 1, 2000; May 8 - August 24, 2001)
Antes muerta que Lichita (February 17 - July 31, 2020)
Apuesta por un amor (October 8, 2006 - March 5, 2007; November 30, 2021 - March 7, 2022)
Atrévete a Soñar (June 20, 2016 - February 13, 2017; June 20 - September 16, 2022)
Aventuras en el tiempo (January 14 - June 14, 2002; August 14, 2017 - January 19, 2018)
Bajo un mismo rostro (Mid summer 1998 - October 5, 1998)
Camila (March 7 - July 8, 2000; May 8 - September 11, 2001)
Cañaveral de Pasiones (November 14, 1997 - January 21, 1998; October 6, 1998 - February 13, 1999)
Carita de Ángel (May 18 - December 9, 2015)
Clap, el lugar de tus sueños (May 29 - August 11, 2017)
Cómplices Al Rescate (January 4 - June 8, 2016)
Código Postal (January 19 - November 9, 2018)
Confidente de secundaria (January - April 1998)
Corazón salvaje (March 28 – November 7, 1997; September 2 –  October 27, 1998; July 13, 2003 – April 25, 2004)
Cuando me enamoro (November 30, 2015 - May 27, 2016)
Cuento de Navidad (November 4–28, 2000; December 15, 2003 - January 2, 2004; December 12–30, 2011; December 9–27, 2013; December 10–30, 2015; November 28 - December 16, 2016)
Cuidado con el ángel (February 14 - August 10, 2017)
De que te quiero, te quiero (March 2 - November 30, 2020)
Despertar contigo (September 1 - November 29, 2021)
DKDA: Sueños de juventud (January 2 - July 21, 2001)
El diario de Daniela (February 26 - July 19, 2018)
El vuelo de la victoria (July 20 - October 2, 2020)
Enamorándome de Ramón (April 27 - July 20, 2020)
En carne propia (July 6, 1999 - November 13, 1999)
Eva Luna (soap opera) (April 7 - July 18, 2014)
Gotita de amor (March 20 - July 6, 2000; August 20 - December 11, 2001)
Hasta que el dinero nos separe (September 10, 2012 - February 15, 2013)
La casa en la playa (August 31 - November 29, 2001)
La fea más bella (February 11 - October 25, 2013; October 8, 2018 - April 9, 2019)
La fuerza del destino (September 19, 2016 - February 8, 2017; December 14, 2020 - March 1, 2021)
La Madrastra (January 26 - May 15, 2015)
La mujer del Vendaval (March 7 - July 11, 2022)
La que no podía amar (November 7, 2016 - March 22, 2017)
La sombra del otro (April 16, 1998 - July 9, 1998)
La Taxista (June 3 - September 23, 2019; first-run; August 17 - December 16, 2020; rerun)
La usurpadora (February 21 - July 14, 2000; December 4, 2001 - April 27, 2002)
La vecina (February 7, 2022 - June 17, 2022)
Las amazonas (May 10 - June 22, 2021)
Las Tontas No Van al Cielo (April 1 - June 14, 2013; October 8, 2018 - March 8, 2019)
Leonela, muriendo el amor (April 21 - October 2, 1999)
Llena de amor (October 19, 2015 - July 15, 2016; March 11 - September 20, 2019)
Lola, érase una vez (May 15 - December 14, 2017; April 4 - September 8, 2022)
Los elegidos (September 21 - November 6, 2020)
Luz Clarita (April - June 1998; January - March 1999; July 10 - October 13, 2000)
Mar de amor (November 9, 2020 - March 12, 2021)
María Isabel (December 28, 1998 - February 9, 1999; July 4 - September 30, 2000; August 28 - December 1, 2001)
María la del Barrio (January 22 - March 27, 1998; March 22 - July 28, 1999; August 17 - December 27, 2000; May 6 - September 12, 2019)
María Mercedes (May 14 - September 4, 1998; July 29 - November 24, 1999; April 24 - August 16, 2000; March 16 - May 28, 2015; May 6 - August 27, 2019)
Marimar (November 18, 1998 - March 19, 1999, January 12 - April 22, 2000, June 1 - September 15, 2015)
Marisol (August 5 - November 13, 1997; December 28, 2000 - July 21, 2001)
Mi corazón es tuyo (May 29 - October 1, 2018; October 29, 2018 - April 5, 2019)
Mi Destino Eres Tú (November 30, 2001 - April 4, 2002; March 27 - May 26, 2017)
Mi pequeña traviesa (September 15, 1999 - February 4, 2000; July 23, 2018 - January 8, 2019)
Misión S.O.S (May 30 - October 7, 2016)
Miss XV (March 25, 2013 - May 24, 2014)
Muchachitas como tú (May 18 - December 7, 2020)
Mujer de madera (August 28, 2019 - February 7, 2020)
Mujeres engañadas (December 4, 2001 - May 24, 2002)
Navidad sin fin (December 9–27, 2013; December 15, 2014 - January 2, 2015; December 21, 2015 - January 1, 2016; December 19, 2016 - January 6, 2017)
 Niña de mi corazón (January 27 - May 15, 2020)
Nunca Te Olvidaré (December 27, 2000 - May 5, 2001)
Pobre niña rica (October 16, 1997 - January 21, 1998)
Porque el amor manda (May 13 - September 20, 2019)
Por ella soy Eva (September 23, 2019 - February 13, 2020)
Por tu amor (July 24 - December 1, 2001)
Preciosa (October 16, 2000 - February 16, 2001)
Pueblo chico, infierno grande (February 16 - June 5, 1999)
Qué pobres tan ricos (July 11 - September 6, 2022)
Ramona (March 4 - June 14, 2002)
Rayito de luz (December 8–31, 2015; November 28 - December 23, 2016)
Rebelde (May 29, 2017 - May 2, 2018)
Rencor apasionado (October 3 - December 26, 2000)
Rosalinda (May 7 - August 24, 2001)
Rubí (July 7 - October 10, 2014)
Salomé (July 29, 2019 - February 28, 2020)
Sentimientos Ajenos (January 22 - April 15, 1998; July 23 - September 2, 1998)
Siempre te amaré (January 21 - June 7, 2002)
Sin ti (September 28, 1999 - January 11, 2000)
Somos tú y yo (October 12, 2011 - January 29, 2012)
Soñadoras (February 19 - October 24, 2001)
Sortilegio (November 24, 2014 - February 20, 2015)
Soy Luna (June 25 - October 26, 2018)
Tenías que ser tú (March 2 - May 3, 2021)
Tres mujeres (March 25–29, 2013)
Tú y yo (July 10, 1998 - January 26, 1999; September 22, 1999 - February 21, 2000)
Un gancho al corazón (July 18, 2016 - March 6, 2017)
Un refugio para el amor (June 23, 2021 - October 22, 2021)
Una familia con suerte (September 22, 2014 - January 16, 2015; January 14, 2019 - January 21, 2020)
Vencer el miedo July 28 - August 31, 2021
¡Vivan los niños! (May 2 - September 15, 2016)
Yo amo a Juan Querendon (October 28, 2013 - April 25, 2014)
Yo compro esa mujer (October 28 - December 23, 1998)

Drama series  
Como dice el dicho 
El Pantera (September 7, 2020 - November 4, 2020)
Esta historia me suena (September 6, 2019 - September 16, 2022)
Falsos falsificados (March 3, 2021 - May 28, 2021)
Los Cowboys (September 21, 2016 - January 30, 2017)
La rosa de Guadalupe
Los héroes del norte (January 19, 2018 - December 1, 2018)
Mujer, Casos de la Vida Real (September 19, 2011 - October 14, 2011; April 1, 2013 - January 2, 2014; May 25, 2014 - July 20, 2014)
Prueba de Fe (April 15, 2019 - 2020)
Regalos de vida (December 23, 2019 - 2021)
Sin miedo a la verdad (November 9, 2020 - March 2, 2021)

Comedy programming 
Al Derecho y al Derbez
A Oscuras Pero Encendidos (March 1, 1997 - January 30, 2000)
Anabel
Aquí está la Chilindrina (2009)
 Bajo el mismo techo (February 23, 2019 - June 15, 2019)
Bienvenidos
Casate Conmigo mi Amor
Casos y Cosas de Casa
Cheverisimo
Chespirito
Con Ganas
Corazón contento (December 28–30, 2020)
Dr. Cándido Pérez
Durmiendo con mi jefe
El Balcon de Veronica
El Chapulín Colorado
El Chavo del 8 (2000 - August 1, 2020)
El Privilegio de Mandar (March 4, 2018 - August 19, 2018)
El show de la Pantera Rosa (June 1, 2020 - 2021)
Enchufe TV (September 5, 2016 - 2017)
Furcio
Goin' Loco (July 18, 2019 - 2021)
Hospital el Paisa (February 24, 2019 - June 9, 2019)
Hotel todo incluido
La Hora Pico
La parodia a domicilio (June 16, 2019 - 2021)
La Rochela
Locos y sueltos (2009)
Los González (May 31, 2017 - May 24, 2018; August 26, 2018 - February 7, 2019)
Los Super Pérez (2016)
No Te Equivoques
Que Locos 
¡Qué madre tan padre!
Radio Pirata
Se rentan cuartos (December 21–24, 2020)
Una familia de diez
XH Derbez (May 15, 2017 - June 6, 2019)
Y Sin Embargo Se Mueve

Reality/non-scripted 
Al Desnudo
Con Cierta Intimidad
Narcos: Guerra antidrogas (February 11, 2017 - April 22, 2017)
Familias frente al fuego (August 31, 2019 - October 14, 2019)
GalaScene
La Apuesta (October 13, 2016 - December 23, 2016)
Parodiando Noches de Traje (2016; February 24, 2019 - June 9, 2019)
Pequeños Gigantes USA (May 29, 2017 - July 14, 2017)
VideoMix

Talk shows 
Al sabor del chef (February 11, 2019 - March 31, 2019)
Club 4 TV
Con Todo
Cuentamelo Ya (September 19, 2016 - March 10, 2017; April 3 - May 27, 2017; May 2 - August 12, 2022)
El show de Johnny y Nora Canales (July 20, 2018 - September 24, 2018)
En Casa de Lucy
En Constraste
Esta noche con Arath (August 30, 2016 - November 7, 2016)
Hasta el límite
Hoy (April 29, 2002 - 2011; 2022)
Laura (May 31, 2021 - 2022)
México de mil sabores (February 11, 2019 - July 7, 2019)
Mojoe
Nuestra Casa
Pa'La Banda Night Show
¡Qué Mujeres!Vida TotalVida TV News Al aire con Paola Rojas (August 22, 2016 - April 5, 2019)Lo mejor de Aquí y AhoraArchivos de más alláCrónicas (February 23, 2019 - May 30, 2020)Despierta (August 22, 2016 - March 13, 2020)En punto (August 22, 2016 - 2022)Las Noticias por AdelaLas Noticias con Danielle Dithurbide (August 22, 2016 - February 8, 2019)Las Noticias con Karla Iberia (February 13, 2017 - March 10, 2017; April 3, 2017 - April 12, 2017)Los ReporterosMás Alla de la FamaMás Curiosidades (June 3, 2019 - April 2, 2021)Noticiero con Joaquin Lopez Doriga (April 29, 2002 - August 19, 2016)Noticiero con Lolita AyalaNoticiero con Lourdes RamosNoticiero con Paola RojasNueva VisionParalelo 23 (December 17, 2018 - September 27, 2019)Por UstedPrimero Noticias (April 29, 2002 - August 19, 2016)Tras la verdadVision AM Children's programming Ángeles (June 26, 2017 - April 15, 2018)Aventuras en Pocketville (June 26, 2017 - December 3, 2017)Cuentos de hadas (May 29, 2017 - July 21, 2019)El Chapulín Colorado Animado (April 29, 2017 - September 2, 2017)El Chavo Animado (May 31, 2016 - October 21, 2017)El sofá de la imaginaciónFunnymals (June 20, 2016 - October 26, 2018)HumphreyJelly Jam (June 26, 2017 - November 26, 2017)Kin (August 13, 2018 - January 27, 2019)Kipatla (July 16, 2018 - August 10, 2018; December 17, 2018 - January 11, 2019)La CQ (May 30 - August 31, 2016; June 18 - July 20, 2018; December 8, 2020 - March 2022)La Familia Telerin (June 26, 2017 - November 26, 2017)Mi casitaMonstruos y piratas (June 27, 2017 - April 22, 2018)Planeta Burbujas (July 22, 2019 - March 1, 2020)SalsaThe Avatars (September 4, 2017 - February 13, 2019)Woki Tokis (August 13, 2018 - January 27, 2019)

 Game shows 100 mexicanos dijieron (August 1, 2017 - March 2018)123 x Mexico (April 9, 2016 - May 21, 2016)El juego de las estrellas (June 10, 2017 - March 2018)Minuto para ganar VIP (June 4 - September 2, 2022)Recuerda y Gana'' (April 9 - June 2016)

Sports programming 
Acción
Boxeo en Esta Esquina
Fanaticos del Frio
FIFA Women's World Cup
FIFA World Cup
 Formula 1 (April 8, 2018 - 2019)
Fútbol A Fondo
Fútbol Mundial
La Jugada
Liga MX
Lucha Libre
Más Deportes
UEFA Champions League (August 21, 2018 - 2022)
Zona Abierta

Galavisión HD
The channel launched in 1080i high definition on June 1, 2010. DirecTV launched the channel in HD on August 15, 2013.

Controversies

Carriage disputes
Galavisión, along with its sister channels, Univision, UniMás, Univision Deportes Network and Univision Tlnovelas were dropped by AT&T U-verse on March 4, 2016, due to a carriage dispute. This did not affect DirecTV Customers (although it is a Subsidiary of U-Verse's parent company, AT&T) as this was done in a different contract before AT&T acquired DirecTV. All of Univision's networks, including Galavisión, were returned to the U-verse lineup on March 24, 2016 after finalizing a carriage deal.

On January 27, 2017, Charter Spectrum (along with Time Warner Cable and Bright House, the latter merged with Charter Communications in 2016) faced another dispute with Univision, warning Charter Communications that Galavision and its sister channels could be removed from Charter by January 31, 2017. Prior to then, Univision sued Charter over pay carriage rates at the New York Supreme Court in July 2016. On January 31, 2017, Charter customers lost access to all of Univision's channels, including UniMás, and Galavisión (including access to its Owned-and-Operated Stations via Charter). On February 2, the New York Superior Court ordered Univision to end the blackout on Charter as negotiations continue. This blackout affects all Univision affiliates, even if Univision doesn't own them, so this dispute includes all stations owned by Entravision Communications, even if Entravision was not involved in the dispute.

On October 16, 2017 at around 5 PM EDT, Verizon FiOS, without any warning, pulled Univision, along with UniMás, UDN, and Galavisión despite an extension of an agreement arranged by the two.

References

External links
 

Hispanic and Latino American culture in Miami
Univision
Television channels and stations established in 1979
Spanish-language television networks in the United States
Spanish-language mass media in Florida
Televisa